Ecurobius is a monotypic genus of Middle Eastern tangled nest spiders containing the single species, Ecurobius parthicus. It was first described by Alireza Zamani and Yuri M. Marusik in 2021, and it has only been found in Iran.

See also
 List of Amaurobiidae species

References

Monotypic Amaurobiidae genera
Arthropods of Iran